Collina glabicira is a species of Tasmanian orb-weaver spiders first described by A. T. Urquhart in 1891, and the only species in the genus Collina. It is known from a single female holotype that isn't among the types at the Canterbury Museum, nor was a plate of the figure ever printed. The original description alone is not enough to identify it, so this species and its genus is considered a nomen dubium.

References

Araneidae
Spiders of Australia
Spiders described in 1891